Clifford Albert Lincoln (born September 1, 1928) is a Canadian politician who served as a member of the Quebec National Assembly, a provincial cabinet minister and a member of  the House of Commons of Canada.

Lincoln was born in Mauritius to Francis Lincoln, a British colonial civil servant, and Régina De Baize.  He studied insurance in Mauritius and in Cape Town, South Africa.  He emigrated to Canada in 1958, settling first in Vancouver and then in Montreal, where he became an insurance company executive.

He was first elected to the Quebec National Assembly in 1981 as a member of the Liberal Party.  When the Liberals formed government in 1985, Lincoln was appointed Minister of the Environment by Premier Robert Bourassa.

Lincoln and two other anglophone ministers resigned from cabinet in 1989, to protest the Bourassa government's language policy and its adoption of Bill 178, which invoked the notwithstanding clause of the Canadian Constitution  to require French to be the dominant language on commercial signs.

He campaigned for the leadership of the Liberal Party of Canada in 1990.  At the same time, he contested a by-election in the federal electoral district of Chambly.  He lost the by-election to Phil Edmonston of the New Democratic Party and then withdrew from the Liberal leadership contest.

He was elected to Parliament in the 1993 federal election in the district of Lachine—Lac-Saint-Louis and was re-elected in Lac-Saint-Louis in 1997 and 2000.  He served as parliamentary secretary to the Deputy Prime Minister and the Minister of the Environment from 1993 until 1996.  He also served as Chairman of the Standing Committee on Canadian Heritage from 1997 until 2004.  As such he wrote a report on Canadian broadcasting, Our Cultural Sovereignty: The Second Century of Canadian Broadcasting; its recommendations were largely ignored by the government.

Lincoln retired from politics at the 2004 federal election and was appointed Chairman of the Panel on Access to Third-language Public Television Services by the federal government.

As of 2007, Lincoln is President of the Board of Directors of the English Speaking Catholic Council of Quebec.  In December 2012, he released Toward New Horizons, a memoir of his life in politics.

References

Sources

Documents on the Controversy Surrounding the Language of Commercial Signs in Quebec (Bill 178) December 1988 Clifford Lincoln's resignation speech, accessed December 26, 2005.
Text of Bill 178, accessed December 26, 2005.
Remember the Lincoln Report accessed December 26, 2005.

Electoral record (incomplete)

1928 births
Living people
Liberal Party of Canada MPs
Members of the Executive Council of Quebec
Members of the House of Commons of Canada from Quebec
Quebec Liberal Party MNAs
Anglophone Quebec people
People from Plaines Wilhems District
21st-century Canadian politicians
20th-century Canadian politicians
Canadian Catholics
Mauritian emigrants to Canada